The palmar ulnocarpal ligament is a ligament of the radiocarpal joint.

It consists of ulnolunate, ulnocapitate, and ulnotriquetal ligaments.

References

External links
 http://classes.kumc.edu/sah/resources/handkines/ligaments/wvdpalmulna.htm

Ligaments of the upper limb